Min Sheng Bao was a tabloid newspaper based in Taiwan, and was a sister publication of United Daily News, then Taiwan's second most circulated newspaper.

It started publication in 1978, and became defunct and published its last print and online edition on December 1, 2006.

External links
Website

1978 establishments in Taiwan
2006 disestablishments in Taiwan
Defunct newspapers published in Taiwan
Newspapers established in 1978
Publications disestablished in 2006
Mass media in Taipei